Kritika Kamra (born 25 October 1988) is an Indian film and television actress.

Kamra is known for playing Arohi in television shows Kitani Mohabbat Hai, Dr. Nidhi in Kuch Toh Log Kahenge, Ananya in Reporters and Chandrakanta in Prem Ya Paheli - Chandrakanta. In 2014 she participated in the dance reality show Jhalak Dikhhla Jaa.

Kamra made her Bollywood debut in 2018 with Mitron.

Early life
Kamra was born in Bareilly, Uttar Pradesh and grew up in her hometown Ashoknagar, Madhya Pradesh. She did her early schooling at Anand Primary School, Sukhpur, where her father is a dentist and mother a nutritionist and an educationist in Shri Anandpur Trust Charitable Hospital, Ashoknagar. She also briefly attended Tara Sadan Sr. Secondary school, Ashoknagar, M.P. She completed her middle school from St. Joseph's Senior Secondary School, Kanpur, Uttar Pradesh and then pursued secondary and higher secondary studies at Delhi Public School, New Delhi. She then went on to study fashion at National Institute of Fashion Technology but dropped out after her first year, as she was cast for Yahan Ke Hum Sikandar.

Filmography

Films

Web series

Television

Discography

Awards and nominations

See also

References

External links

1988 births
Living people
Indian soap opera actresses
People from Bareilly